Mangelia coplicata is an extinct species of sea snail, a marine gastropod mollusk in the family Mangeliidae. The length of the shell attains 9 mm. This extinct marine species was found in Eocene strata in the Paris Basin, France.

Further reading 
 Pezant A. 1905. Des doubles emplois en nomenclature. La Feuille des jeunes Naturalistes 414: 88–89.
 Cossmann M. 1907.  Catalogue illustré des coquilles fossiles de l’Éocène des environs de Paris. Appendice n° 4. Annales de la Société royale zoologique et malacologique de Belgique 41: 182–286.

References

External links
 PaCaud, Jean-Michel. "Nouveautés nomenclaturales et taxinomiques introduites par Alcide d’Orbigny dans le Prodrome (1850, 1852) pour les espèces du Paléocène et de l’Éocène." Geodiversitas 29.1 (2007): 17-85.
 Fossilshells : Mangelia coplicata

coplicata
Gastropods described in 1905